The 2015 Tour of the Basque Country was the 55th edition of the Tour of the Basque Country stage race. It took place from 6 to 11 April and was the ninth race of the 2015 UCI World Tour. The race was won by Joaquim Rodríguez.

Schedule

Teams 
As the Tour of the Basque Country was a UCI World Tour event, all 17 UCI WorldTeams were invited automatically and were obliged to send a squad. Two Professional Continental teams received wildcard invitations.

Stages

Stage 1
6 April 2015 — Bilbao to Bilbao,

Stage 2 
7 April 2015 — Bilbao to Vitoria-Gasteiz,

Stage 3 
8 April 2015 — Vitoria-Gasteiz to Zumarraga,

Stage 4 

Stage 5 
10 April 2015 — Eibar to Aia,

Stage 6 
11 April 2015 — Aia to Aia, individual time trial (ITT)

Classification leadership table
In the Tour of the Basque Country, four different jerseys were awarded. For the general classification, calculated by adding each cyclist's finishing times on each stage, the leader received a yellow jersey. This classification was considered the most important of the Tour of the Basque Country, and the winner of the classification was the winner of the race.

Additionally, there was a points classification, which awarded a white jersey. In the points classification, cyclists received points for finishing in the top 15 in a stage. For winning a stage, a rider earned 25 points, second place earned 20 points, third 16, fourth 14, fifth 12, sixth 10, and one point fewer per place down to a single point for 15th. There was also a mountains classification, the leadership of which was marked by a red jersey with white dots. In the mountains classification, points were won by reaching the top of a climb before other cyclists, with more points available for the higher-categorised climbs.

The fourth jersey represented the sprints classification, marked by a blue jersey. In the sprints classification, cyclists received points for finishing in the top 3 at intermediate sprint points during each stage, with the exception of the final individual time trial stage. There was also a classification for teams, in which the times of the best three cyclists per team on each stage were added together; the leading team at the end of the race was the team with the lowest total time.

References

External links
 

Tour of the Basque Country by year
Tour of the Basque Country
Tour of the Basque Country